Morrow Township may refer to the following townships in the United States:

 Morrow Township, Washington County, Arkansas
 Morrow Township, Adair County, Missouri